Tai Po Government Primary School is a co-educational primary school located in Tai Po, Hong Kong.

See also
 List of primary schools in Hong Kong

External links

 School website

Tai Po
Primary schools in Hong Kong